Francis Marion McDaniel Jr. (March 25, 1923 – February 1, 2018) was an American politician in the state of South Dakota who served as a member of the South Dakota House of Representatives. He is an alumnus of Black Hills State University, Northrop University and was an aeronautic engineer and car dealer. He worked as an engineer for the Western Eletrochemical Company and the American Potash and Chemical Company. McDaniel died in Hot Springs, South Dakota on February 1, 2018, at the age of 94.

References

1923 births
2018 deaths
Black Hills State University alumni
Democratic Party members of the South Dakota House of Representatives
Northrop University alumni
People from Dewey County, South Dakota